The Dark class, or Admiralty "Type A", were a class of eighteen fast patrol boats that served with the United Kingdom's Royal Navy starting in 1954. All were named with a prefix of 'Dark'. The class could be fitted as either motor gun boats or motor torpedo boats, depending on the type of armament carried. They were the only diesel engined fast patrol boats in the Royal Navy. The class was fitted (along with the Nasty class) with the Napier Deltic two-stroke diesel engine. This was of unique layout, an opposed-piston engine with a triangular layout of three banks, 18 cylinders in total.

Construction 
The boats were constructed with alloy framing and wooden decks and skin.  The exception was Dark Scout which had all aluminium decks, skins and frames. Originally 27 units were ordered by the admiralty from seven builders. Nine were eventually cancelled in 1955, including Dark Horseman which at the time was partially completed and on the stocks in the builders yard.

The all-aluminium version was exported to Burma (five units), Finland (two units), and Japan (one unit) by builders Saunders-Roe.

Design
With no previous experience of using diesel engines in vessels of this size, it was not fully understood how dirty they would get from the exhaust fumes.  Originally launched in the normal Royal Navy grey, they eventually had their hulls painted completely black to disguise the staining from exhaust emissions . For a short while, a compromise half grey/half black combination was used.

Fate
An Admiralty decision in 1957 took nearly all fast patrol boats out of commission, with nine of the new Dark-class to be laid up. On 20 December 1960, the Admiralty stated that the Coastal Forces would not be completely abandoned in case it needed to be expanded in the future.  A special boat squadron was nominated, but it did not include any of the Dark-class.

Several of the ships were sold to Wessex Power Units for sale onto the Italian Customs Service  (8 hulls) in February 1966.  Two were used for target practice, with Dark Gladiator sunk by HMS Amazon and HMS Naiad off Portland in December 1975. At least two, Dark Clipper and Dark Fighter, managed to survive up to as recently as June 2001 when they were broken up in Malta.

Legacy 
The Dark class would be the final commission of this quantity for patrol boats of this size and speed.  The following classes had greatly reduced numbers with the  numbering only two vessels and  numbering only three.

A similar hull design was used by Saunders-Roe in a prototype, R-103, which led to the development of the experimental hydrofoil, for the Royal Canadian Navy.

Ships

Cancelled ships

Notes

References

 
 
 
 
 

 
Fast attack craft
Napier Deltic
Patrol boat classes
Ship classes of the Royal Navy